The American Mercury is a historical newspaper that was published in Hartford, Connecticut in the early years of the American Republic. The paper was founded by Elisha Babcock (1753–1821) and Joel Barlow (1754–1812) and was "the leading Democratic paper in the state", propounding Jeffersonian liberalism. The paper was succeeded by the Independent Press.

References

Newspapers published in Connecticut
1784 establishments in the United States
1833 disestablishments in the United States